The M712 Copperhead is a 155 mm caliber cannon-launched guided projectile. It is 
a fin-stabilized, terminally laser guided, explosive shell intended to engage hard point targets such as tanks, self-propelled howitzers or other high-value targets.  It may be fired from different artillery pieces, such as the M114, M109, M198, M777 and CAESAR howitzers.  The projectile has a minimum range of 3 km and a maximum range of 16 km.

Development
The concept for Copperhead was originally made in 1970 by engineers at the US Army's Rodman Laboratories, with feasibility studies conducted in 1971. In 1972 development contracts were awarded to Martin Marietta and Texas Instruments. After testing Martin Marietta was chosen for continued development through the 1970s.

Inventories of March 1, 1995: 
 US Army : Usable : 16,095 - Unusable 0 - Total : 16,095
 USMC : Usable : 1,873 -    Unusable : 894  - Total : 2,767

Description 

For Copperhead to function, the target must be illuminated with a laser designator.  Once the laser signal is detected, the on-board guidance system will operate the steering vanes to maneuver the projectile to the target.  The Copperhead targeting logic is designed to ensure (1) that the optical system will always be able to detect the target, and (2) that once the target has been detected there will be sufficient time and velocity to maneuver to hit the target.  Copperhead must be below any cloud cover at critical parts of the trajectory, and there must be sufficient visibility to ensure that when the target is acquired the projectile will have sufficient time to maneuver.

Modes of operation

Copperhead has two modes of operation: ballistic mode and glide mode. Ballistic mode is used where the cloud ceiling is high and visibility is good. When the projectile is 3,000 meters from the target, the guidance vanes extend, the target is acquired, and then the on-board guidance system adjusts the guidance vanes to maneuver onto the target.

Glide mode is used when the cloud ceiling and/or the visibility is too low to permit the use of the ballistic mode. A glide mode trajectory consists of two phases: a ballistic phase and a glide phase. At a predetermined point along the trajectory, the guidance vanes extend and there is a transition from ballistic phase to glide phase. Glide phase targeting logic is designed to ensure the largest possible angle of fall permitted by the cloud cover and the visibility. The target is acquired when the projectile is close enough to detect the laser illumination or when the projectile emerges from the cloud cover, whichever event occurs later in the trajectory. When a trajectory solution has been obtained, time-to-target and terminal velocity are checked to ensure that there will be enough time to maneuver and that the projectile is aerodynamically stable—that it will not stall while maneuvering.

Initially the laser designation was intended to be performed by the MQM-105 Aquila pilotless drone.

Combat history
Copperhead was used in Operation Desert Storm, with 90 rounds fired against hardened Iraqi fortifications and radar stations. One of these strikes caused an Iraqi unit to surrender.

Lebanese Armed Forces fired several hundred Copperhead shells at ISIL targets in east Lebanon during the Qalamoun offensive (July–August 2017). At least five technicals, five occupied buildings, and several troop formations were struck with precision.
The US replenished 827 shells after the successful completion of the offensive.

Operators

Current operators
  United States
  Egypt
  Jordan
  Lebanon
  Taiwan

Former operators
  Australia – now replaced by SMArt 155.

See also
 M982 Excalibur
 M1156 Precision Guidance Kit
 Krasnopol
 XM395 Precision Guided Mortar Munition
 Bofors/Nexter Bonus
 Strix mortar round

References

Sources
 Yenne, William, Yenne, Bill, Attack of the Drones: A History of Unmanned Aerial Combat, Zenith Imprint, 2004 

155mm artillery shells
Anti-tank rounds
Guided artillery shells
Military equipment introduced in the 1980s